Prismacolor is a brand of professional visual arts supplies originated in 1938 by the Eagle Pencil Company (then taken over by Berol), and currently manufactured by Newell Brands. Prismacolor products include, colored and graphite pencils, soft pastels, erasers, pencil sharpeners, and cases. In past years, Prismacolor also produced watercolor paintings and charcoals.

History
The Eagle Pencil Company founded in the 1800s in Yonkers, New York on John Street. After 5 years, Daniel Berozlzheimer's son Henry purchased the city's first iron-framed building for the new factory. The company produced pens, pencils, pen holders and erasers. In 1897, the London branch confirmed the policy of selling manufactured goods with high quality. Over the years, the company changed focus and goods. In 1952, Margros Ltd was founded by Mr. P.G.Hooley, who invented Powdered Colour and sold it directly to schools. The business grew and the company was sold to Eagle Pencil Company in 1967.

The company which later became Osmiroid International was started in 1824 by James Perry who joined his brother in the penmaking business. In 1989, the company was bought by Berol Ltd. The Newell Company joined forces with Berol on November 2, 1995. The merging of the two companies made Berol a branch of the Sanford Corporation.

Products

Colored pencils 
One of Prismacolor's main products is their colored pencils. They have two lines of colored pencils called Scholar and Premier. Scholar pencils are made with a hard type of wax and tend to have less pigmentation than the premier line. They are cheaper than the premier line, as they are made with beginning or developing artists in mind. There are 150 different colors total, which are available in packs of 12, 24, 48 and 60, 120 and 150. The Premier lines are available in several different sub-classes—Softcore, Verithin, Watercolor, Col-erase, and Art Stix. line.

With 150 different colors, Prismacolors's Softcore line has the most color variation of all their colored pencil lines. They have an 8mm round barrel, which matches the 5mm diameter wax core. Softcore pencils can be bought individually or in tins that separated the layers of pencils inside with plastic. The tins come in pack variants of 12, 24, 36, 48, 72, 132, and 150. The wax they are made with allows them to be smoother and easier to blend. However, it also causes frequent breaks when pushing down or sharpening the pencil. Some artists microwave them to try and fix this common problem. Another common problem is called "wax bloom." This occurs when there is more wax in colored pencils then there is pigment, or in users who are heavy handed. It causes a wax film to appear over the places the pencil is used, which makes the work look more white or "washed out." Wax bloom can be removed by gently rubbing the affected area with a soft cloth or tissue. Afterwards, some people choose to spray a fixative onto the end product to prevent re-occurrence.

This line has a pencil known as colorless blender. The blender pencil is a clear, colorless, wax pencil used overtop of the colored layer to aid in the color cohesion.

Verithin 
Prismacolor's Verithin pencils are colored pencils typically used for high intricacy work such as portraiture. The pencils first came to be in 1938 under the original "Eagle" brand, and have been sold since both under the "Berol" and "Prismacolor" brands. The pencils are known for having an incredibly hard core and bright pigment, and are very popular among artists.

Watercolor 
Premier Watercolor Colored Pencils provide smooth rich lay down and are water-soluble. They are available in sets of 12, 24, and 36.

Markers 
The line of markers Prismacolor produce are illustrating markers. The common method for using Prismacolor markers is to apply the colors in layers. The different tips allow for the color to be applied in various ways on the application being worked on. Artists use varying colors from the same color line to create shadows and textures on the artwork.

Pastel 
Prismacolor offers several varieties of pastels. There are two qualities to pastels: Artist and Student. Artist quality pastels have a higher ratio of pigment giving more intense color. Student pastels contain more fillers and byproduct to help the stick keep shape and allow the pastel to withstand pressure and crumbling. With artist pastels, the richer pigments and lack of binder cause the product to be more fragile yet costly. Hard pastels are made the same way as a soft pastel but contain more binder and less pigment. Hard pastels are more stable in different drawing techniques and come in both artist and student quality. Pastel pencils are for fine details and control. The shape and size of a pastel pencils resemble colored pencils and are suitable for outdoors work. The makeup of oil pastels is pigment coated in wax or oil giving lines and shading a crayon like texture. Oil pastels are more stable than a soft pastel and do not require a fixative to work. Unlike the other types of pastels, oil based pastels will not smudge, crumble or give off dust when working on paper. Although oil pastels lack the ability to blend into other colors, the pigments can be spread on a canvas like oil paints and are available in both student and artist quality.

References

External links
 

Art materials brands
Pencil brands
he:Prismacolor